The Day You Went Away: The Best of M2M is a greatest hits compilation album by Norwegian teen-pop duo M2M. It was released in 2003, a year after the group's disbandment.

The compilation includes all of their singles from their two studio albums Shades of Purple and The Big Room, acoustic versions of some other songs and popular album tracks. It also contains a Mandarin Chinese version of their song "Pretty Boy" and a Spanish version of "Everything You Do". "Everything" is also shortened without the faded out ending and "Everything You Do" was completely re-recorded with new vocals. It also has the previously unreleased songs, "Not to Me" and "Is You". The song "Wait for Me" is also included, which was previously an Australian bonus track for The Big Room. A DVD is included with the album, which contains music videos and a featurette, as well as footage of M2M in Bangkok and Norway.

Marisa Brown from AllMusic gave the album four out of five stars, concluding "It's way more M2M than is necessary, but it certainly does the job of giving the best of them." The liner notes include lyrics to the songs; however, there is a mistake in the lyrics for "Don't Say You Love Me", as the notes contain the lyrics from the version of the song that appeared on Pokémon: The First Movie, whereas the album includes the version that appeared on Shades of Purple.

Track listing
 "The Day You Went Away" – 3:43
 "Mirror Mirror"  – 3:21
 "Pretty Boy" – 4:40
 "Don't Say You Love Me"  – 3:46
 "Everything" (New edit / remix) – 3:07
 "Everything You Do" (Re-recorded vocals version) – 4:05
 "Girl In Your Dreams" – 3:40
 "What You Do About Me"（Remix） – 3:21
 "Don't" (Acoustic version) – 3:30
 "Wanna Be Where You Are" – 3:26
 "Not to Me" – 3:09
 "Is You" – 4:01
 "Wait for Me" – 3:06
 "Jennifer" (Acoustic version) – 2:53
 "Love Left For Me" (Acoustic version) – 4:14
 "Pretty Boy" (Mandarin Chinese version) – 4:39
 "Everything" (Acoustic version) – 3:41
 "Don't Say You Love Me" (Tin Tin Out Remix) – 3:33
 "Todo Lo Que Haces" ("Everything You Do" Spanish version) – 4:02
 "Mirror, Mirror" (Power Dance Remix) – 5:56

Personnel

 Marion Raven – Lead vocals, piano, percussion
 Marit Larsen – vocals, guitar
 Matt Rowe – production, arrangement
 Dane DeViller – production, arrangement
 Sean Hosein – production, arrangement
 Per Magnusson – production, arrangement
 David Kreuger – production, arrangement
 Jimmy Bralower – production, arrangement
 Peter Zizzo – production, arrangement
 Kenneth M. Lewis – production, arrangement
 Craig Kallman – production, arrangement
 T-Bone Wolk – production, arrangement, bass, acoustic guitar, mandolin, organ, wurlitzer
 Dean Sharp – drums, percussion
 Tron Syversion – recording
 John Holbrook – recording, mixing
 Damien Shannon – Assistant engineering
 Jimi K. Bones – slide guitar
 José Ramón Flórez – Spanish translator ("Todo Lo Que Haces")
 Neil Perry – recording
 Joshua – recording production (Norwegian)

References

2003 greatest hits albums
M2M (band) albums
Atlantic Records compilation albums